Jean-Claude Haelewyck (born in 1952) is a professor emeritus, semiticist, researcher in the fields of the Old Latin Versions of the Bible and Syriac Studies at Centre d’Études Orientales in Institut Orientaliste de Louvain, Université catholique de Louvain and director of FNRS (Fonds National de la Recherche Scientifique).

Views 
J. C. Haelewyck in 1984, "defended his dissertation on the Lucianic text of the book of Esther", and he affirms that "passages where the AT and the Vetus Latina share the same text are passages where an old Hebrew text of the book of Esther becomes visible." Kristin De Troyer claim: "these passages are, indeed, very important, albeit in my opinion not for the Old Hebrew but rather for the Old Greek text."

Some works 

- 2001 : J.-C. Haelewyck, Sancti Gregorii Nazianzeni Opera. Versio syriaca. I: Oratio 40 (Corpus Christianorum. Corpus Nazianzenum, 14), Turnhout, 221 p.
- 2005 : J.-C. Haelewyck, Sancti Gregorii Nazianzeni Opera. Versio syriaca. III: Orationes 27, 38-39 (Corpus Christianorum. Corpus Nazianzenum, 18), Turnhout, 193 p.

- 2007 : J.-C. Haelewyck, Sancti Gregorii Nazianzeni Opera. Versio syriaca. IV: Orationes 28-31 (Corpus Christianorum. Corpus Nazianzenum, 23), Turnhout, 407 p.
- 2008 : J.-C. Haelewyck, Esther (Vetus Latina. Die Reste der altlateinischen Bibel, 7/3), Freibourg/Breisgau, 440 p.
- 2011 : J.-C. Haelewyck, Sancti Gregorii Nazianzeni Opera. Versio syriaca. V: Orationes 1-3 (Corpus Christianorum. Corpus Nazianzenum, 25), Turnhout, 216 p.
- 2016 : J.-C. Haelewyck (dir.), Histoire de Zosime sur la Vie des Bienhgeureux Réchabites. Les versions orientales et leurs manuscrits (CSCO 664. Subsidia 135), Louvain (sous presse).
- 2018 : J.-C. Haelewyck, Evangelium secundum Marcum (Vetus Latina. Die Reste der altlateinischen Bibel, 17), Freiburg/Breisgau, 2018, 843 p.

Journals

References 

1952 births
Living people
Academic staff of the Université catholique de Louvain
Semiticists
French Hebraists
French biblical scholars